Waxahachie High School is a public high school in the city of Waxahachie, Texas, United States and classified as a 6A school by the University Interscholastic League (UIL). It is a part of the Waxahachie Independent School District located in central Ellis County. In 2015, the school was rated "Met Standard" by the Texas Education Agency.

Academics
Waxahachie High School offers Advanced Placement (AP) in biology, calculus, chemistry, computer science, English language composition, English literature, environmental science, French language, macroeconomics, psychology, Spanish language, Spanish literature, statistics, U.S. government, world history, and U.S. history. As well as offering Advanced Placement classes, they offer Dual Credit classes in collaboration with the local community college, Navarro College. As of 2013, Waxahachie High School offers American Sign Language as an optional language class.

Athletics
The Waxahachie Indians compete in UIL-sanctioned sports including volleyball, cross country, football, basketball, powerlifting, swimming, soccer, golf, tennis, track, baseball, softball, and marching band.

In 1992, the varsity football team won the 4A state championship. The football team plays their home games at Lumpkins Stadium.

The school's baseball team won the 3A state championship in 1965. The boys basketball team won the 3A state championship in 1958 and the 4A state championship in 1983. The girls basketball team won the 4A state championship in 2006.

Extracurricular activities
Waxahachie High School has extracurricular activities such as band, choir, and theater. Waxahachie High School also offers several CTSOs to its students including FFA, Skills USA and TSA. Other organizations on campus include DI, Interact, and NHS.

Band

The Spirit of Waxahachie Indian Band is the largest organization on campus, with 250 members. For over 20 years, the band has received numerous awards both locally and around the nation, having been a consistent UIL State Marching Contest finalist and 5A bronze medalist in 2017. The band is also a consistent Bands of America regional finalist, and performed at the 2000 Macy's Thanksgiving Day Parade. The band has also been named a finalist for Phi Beta Mu's Earl D. Irons Program of Distinction Award.

In concert literature, the Waxahachie High School Wind Ensemble was named the 2011 Texas Music Educators Association (TMEA) 4A Honor Band and performed at the association's 2012 convention. The Foundation for Music Education (TFME) named the ensemble a Class 4A "Commended Winner" in 2013 and a "National Winner" in 2014 in the Mark of Excellence Wind Band Awards. The Wind Ensemble was named the 2017 TMEA 5A Honor Band, performing at the 2018 convention. The Jazz Orchestra was named the 2018 TMEA Invited Jazz Ensemble, performing at the 2019 TMEA convention in San Antonio, TX, and performed at the 2019 Midwest Clinic in Chicago.

Theater 
The WHS Theater Department has consistently qualified for state competition in UIL One Act Play, and has won several Dallas Summer Musicals High School Theater awards.

Notable alumni

 Alex Bhore, Musician, drummer for This Will Destroy You
 Ronnie Dawson, Rockabilly band leader
 Desmond Mason, former NBA player (2001 Slam Dunk Contest Champion)
 Montae Reagor, former NFL player
Jalen Reagor, NFL player
 Jeremiah Richey, Musician, singer. Appeared in Can You Duet, alongside Nick Brownell.
 Aldrick Robinson, NFL player
 Broderick Sargent, former NFL player
 Brian Waters, former NFL player
 John Wray, Former Texas state representative for Ellis County and former mayor of Waxahachie
Paul Richards, former MLB player/manager

References

Further reading
 Solomon, Dan. "Waxahachie High School Blew Their Playoff Chances By Taking Heads On A Coin Toss" (Archive). Texas Monthly. November 10, 2015.

External links
Waxahachie High School
Indian Band
Waxahachie Indian Fo

Schools in Ellis County, Texas
Public high schools in Texas
Educational institutions established in 1864
1864 establishments in Texas